Chuzenji Dam (Pre) is a gravity dam located in Tochigi prefecture in Japan. The dam is used for flood control and power production. The catchment area of the dam is 125 km2. The dam impounds about 1140  ha of land when full and can store 25100 thousand cubic meters of water. The construction of the dam was started on 1953 and completed in 1959.

References

Dams in Tochigi Prefecture
1959 establishments in Japan